Hydrablabes is a genus of snakes in the subfamily Natricinae of the family Colubridae. The genus contains two species.

Geographic range
Both species of the genus Hydrablabes are endemic to Borneo.

Species
The following two species are recognized as being valid.
Hydrablabes periops  — olive small-eyed snake
Hydrablabes praefrontalis  — Mocquard's small-eyed snake

Nota bene: A binomial authority in parentheses indicates that the species was originally described in a genus other than Hydrablabes.

References

Further reading
Boulenger GA (1891). "Remarks on the Herpetological Fauna of Mount Kina Baloo, North Borneo". Ann. Mag. Nat. Hist., Sixth Series 7: 341–345. (Hydrablabes, new genus, p. 343-344).
Boulenger GA (1893). Catalogue of the Snakes in the British Museum (Natural History). Volume I., Containing the Families ... Colubridæ Aglyphæ, part. London: Trustees of the British Museum (Natural History). (Taylor and Francis, printers). xiii + 448 pp. + Plates I-XXVIII. (Genus Hydrablabes, p. 296; species H. periops, p. 296; species H. præfrontalis, p. 297).
Das I (2006). A Photographic Guide to Snakes and other Reptiles of Borneo. Sanibel Island, Florida: Ralph Curtis Books. 144 pp. . (Hydrablabes periops, pp. 9, 38; H. praefrontalis, p. 10).

Hydrablabes
Reptiles of Borneo
Taxa named by George Albert Boulenger